The Phantom Ship is a 1936 animated short film and is part of the Looney Tunes series. It stars Beans the Cat, along with spotted St. Bernard puppies Ham and Ex.

Plot
Ham and Ex are reading a press release about their uncle Beans who is flying north to explore an old galleon. Outside, Beans is preparing his aircraft for his trip to the north. Without their uncle's knowledge, Ham and Ex board the backseats. Beans himself finally hops in and flies the aircraft.

Beans arrives at the Arctic, parking his plane just near the frozen ship. Ham and Ex show themselves, much to their uncle's surprise. Nevertheless, Beans takes them along. The three young explorers set foot on the rickety old vessel. Ghostly forces toss Beans around while Ham and Ex get tangled with a skeleton. Finally the trio end up in the hull. In a room, they find a treasure chest with booty. Beans then notices a couple of buccaneers who have been frozen for a very long time. Beans then takes the chairs they are sitting on and lights a fire in the stove, causing the buccaneers to defrost and awaken, while Beans loads his plane with the treasure.

The two buccaneers give chase to the trio, until Ham and Ex land inside the plane and take off. Meanwhile, Beans dodges one of the buccaneers who hurls a powder keg at him and it explodes, launching him the air. Ham and Ex manage to rescue him in midair. After some rejoice the three explorers fly back home.

Notes
Ham and Ex make their second appearance in this short. This is also the first time they wear garments and shoes.
This is also the first cartoon to feature the zooming WB shield in the opening titles and the first to have "VITAPHONE Presents". The zooming WB shield would mainly be used in the Warner Bros. Cartoons opening titles until 1964, while "VITAPHONE Presents" would be used in the Warner Bros. Cartoons opening titles until April 1939.

References

External links

1936 films
American black-and-white films
Films scored by Bernard B. Brown
Films scored by Norman Spencer (composer)
Films directed by Jack King
Films set in the Arctic
Films set on ships
Looney Tunes shorts
Warner Bros. Cartoons animated short films
Pirate films
Beans the Cat films
Animated films about cats
Animated films about dogs
1936 animated films
1930s Warner Bros. animated short films